Khamiso Khan (1923–1983) was a Pakistani folk artist and alghoza player from Sindh, Pakistan.

Personal life
Khamiso Khan was born in 1923 at Tando Muhammad Khan city, of Tando Muhammad Khan District, Sindh, Pakistan. His son Akbar Khamiso Khan is also a notable Alghoza player.

Career
Khamiso Khan was a contemporary of another notable alghoza player Misri Khan Jamali. Mostly, he played typical Sindhi folk and classical music on alghoza. He was associated with Radio Pakistan, Hyderabad, Sindh as a folk artist for 18 years. Khamiso Khan had performed at many events when touring Europe and America before his death. When Khamiso died of a heart attack, president Muhammad Zia-ul-Haq paid him a tribute in a presidential message that his death was a great loss for folk music in Pakistan.

Awards and recognition
 Pride of Performance Award by the President of Pakistan in 1979.

Death
Khan died after a heart attack on 8 March 1983.

References 

Pakistani artists
Pakistani folk music
Recipients of the Pride of Performance
Sindhi people
1923 births
1983 deaths